Peter Sears may refer to:

 Peter Sears (poet) (1937–2017), American poet
 Peter Sears (ice hockey) (born 1947), American ice hockey player
 Peter Sears (musician) (born 1948), English rock musician